Dareen Abughaida is a Palestinian-Lebanese broadcast journalist. Currently working as a presenter for Al Jazeera English, she has also worked for big establishments such as Bloomberg news, CNBC, World Bank, and Qatar Airways. She also worked with the United Nations at several summits.

Career
Abughaida joined Al Jazeera English in Doha as a news anchor and later anchoring the flagship Newshour. At the station, she has reported on major stories that caught the public eye, such as the Egyptian revolution. She has also covered the resignation of Pope Benedict, the Malaysia Airlines crash, Brexit, and the Palestinian-Israel conflict. Abughaida has also covered the Arab Spring stories and its aftermath. Her coverages have brought significant awareness to various conflicts, especially those between Palestine and Israel.

Previously, she worked for Dubai One in the United Arab Emirates and, before that, for Bloomberg and CNBC.

Personal life
Abughaida graduated from Concordia University in Quebec, with a Bachelor of Commerce degree. For security reasons, Abughaida is highly private with much of her personal life. As of March 2020, Abughaida is reportedly worth $1M.

References

External links

Living people
1984 births
Al Jazeera people
Concordia University alumni
Palestinian journalists
Lebanese people of Palestinian descent